Dmitri Vitalyevich Trenin is a member of . He was the director of the Carnegie Moscow Center, a Russian think tank. A former colonel of Russian military intelligence, Trenin served for 21 years in the Soviet Army and Russian Ground Forces, before joining Carnegie in 1994.

Military career

Trenin served in the Soviet and Russian armed forces from 1972 to 1993. His service included postings both inside and outside of the Soviet Union, to include a stint as the first non-NATO senior research fellow at the NATO Defense College in Rome.

Carnegie Moscow Center (1994-2022)

Trenin joined the Carnegie Moscow Center (which itself was set up with funding from the Nunn–Lugar Cooperative Threat Reduction) in 1994 soon after its formation in the aftermath of the collapse of the Soviet Union.

On December 22, 2008, Trenin became the first Russian director of the Carnegie Moscow Center. Trenin also chaired Carnegie Moscow's research council and the Foreign and Security Policy Program.

According to American journalist James Kirchick, following the re-election of Vladimir Putin in 2012 the Carnegie Moscow Center, which Trenin led, started to gradually adopt pro-Putin positions: this caused the resignation of chair of the think tank's Society and Regions Program, Nikolai Petrov, the editor-in-chief of the center's magazine, Maria Lipman, and Russian political scientist Lilia Shevtsova. All of them were Putin-critics.

The Carnegie Endowment for International Peace ended its affiliation with Dmitri Trenin in early 2022 after he endorsed Putin's war on Ukraine.

Trenin is a member of the International Institute for Strategic Studies (London, United Kingdom), the Russian International Affairs Council (Moscow), and the Russian International Studies Association (Moscow). He is a member of the Board of Trustees of the Moscow School of Political Studies. He is a Senior Network Member at the European Leadership Network (ELN). Trenin was expelled from the Royal Swedish Academy of War Sciences in October 2022 "due to his active support of the unjustified and illegal Russian invasion of Ukraine in both speech and writing".

Views and criticism 
Trenin supports Russia in its "fight with the West". He also criticised people who left Russia after the Russian invasion of Ukraine in 2022. He has commented on future scenarios for Russia.

Analysing Trenin’s narrative around the 2021–2022 Russo-Ukrainian crisis and Russia–United States relations, Russian political writer Andrey Piontkovsky referred to Trenin as an “elite Kremlin propagandist targeting the Western expert audience”.

Works

Authored and co-authored 
 What Is Russia Up to in the Middle East? (Polity: 2018)
 Should We Fear Russia? (Polity: 2016)
 Post-Imperium: A Eurasian Story (Washington, DC: 2011)
 20 Years Without the Berlin Wall: A Breakthrough to Freedom (Moscow: 2011)
 Solo Voyage (Moscow: 2009, in Russian)
 Getting Russia Right (Washington, DC: 2007)
 Central Asia: The Views from Washington, Moscow and Beijing (New York: 2007, co-authored)
 Integration and Identity: Russia as a New West (Moscow: 2006)
 Gestrandete Weltmacht (Hamburg, Germany: 2005, in German)
 Russia's Restless Frontier: The Chechnya Factor in Post-Soviet Russia (Washington, DC: 2003, co-authored)
 The End of Eurasia: Russia on the Border Between Geopolitics and Globalization (Washington, DC: 2002, 2001)
 A Strategy for Stable Peace: Toward a Euro-Atlantic Security Community (Washington, DC: 2002, co-authored)
 Russia's China Problem (Washington, DC: 1998)
 Baltic Chance: The Baltic States, Russia and the West in the Emerging Greater Europe (Washington, DC: 1997)

Edited

 The Challenges of Transition (2011)
 The Russian Military: Power and Policy (2004)
 Ambivalent Neighbors: The NATO and EU Enlargement and the Price of Membership (2003)
 Russia and the Main Security Institutions in Europe: Entering the 21st Century (2000)
 Kosovo: International Aspects of the Crisis (1999)
 Commonwealth and Security in Eurasia (1998)
 Russia in the World Arms Trade: The Strategic, Political, and Economic Dimensions (1997)

References

External links
 Dmitri Trenin on Twitter
 Dmitri Trenin on Facebook
 Dmitri Trenin in The Guardian

International relations scholars
Russian political scientists
Institute directors
1955 births
Living people
Russian studies scholars
Carnegie Endowment for International Peace